Lönnberg is a Swedish surname. It might also be spelled Lonnberg or Loennberg in countries where languages that do not include the letter ö are spoken. As of October 2013, there are 916 people with this surname in Sweden and 9 in the United States.

Variants
 Lonnberg
 Loennberg

Notable people
Notable people with this surname include:
 Anne Lonnberg (born 1948), American actress and singer of Swedish descent
 Daniel Lönnberg, Swedish swimmer
 Einar Lönnberg (1865–1942), Swedish zoologist and conservationist
 Ivan Lönnberg (1891–1918), Swedish painter and long-distance runner

References